Zephyranthes puertoricensis, known commonly as the Puerto Rico zephyr lily, is a species of flowering plant in the amaryllis family, Amaryllidaceae, subfamily Amaryllidoideae. It is native to the West Indies, Panama, Colombia, Suriname and Venezuela. It is a member of low elevation grasslands communities and moist forest habitat.

The plant grows from a bulb about 1.5 centimeters wide, producing shiny, dark green, linear leaves up to about 35 centimeters long and a scape about 9 to 11 centimeters tall. The greenish white tepals are about 4 centimeters long.

References

External links
photograph of herbarium specimen at Missouri Botanical Garden, holotype of Zephyranthes puertoricensis 

puertoricensis
Flora of the Caribbean
Flora of Panama
Flora of Colombia
Flora of Venezuela
Flora of Suriname
Plants described in 1951